Canada first participated at the 1962 World Championships.  It wasn't until 1987 when a Canadian gymnast, Curtis Hibbert, won Canada's first medal.  In 2006 Elyse Hopfner-Hibbs became the first female artistic gymnast to win a medal for Canada.  In 2022 the Canadian women's team won their first team medal, a bronze.

Medalists

Junior World medalists

References

World Artistic Gymnastics Championships
Gymnastics in Canada